Bibi Aisha (Bibi is a term of respect meaning "Lady"; born Aisha Mohammadzai, legal name in the United States: Aesha Mohammadzai) is an Afghan woman who fled from an abusive marriage she was forced into as a teenager, but was caught, jailed, mutilated and left to die as revenge for her escape. She was later rescued by aid workers and her story was featured in American news as an example of the effects of the Taliban's reign of terror on women. As of 2014, she lives in Maryland as the adoptive daughter of an Afghan-American couple and has received reconstructive surgery.

Early life 
Aisha was born into an Afghan family in Afghanistan. She lost her mother at a young age. When she was twelve, her father promised her to a Taliban fighter as compensation in a practice called baad, for a murder committed by a member of Aisha's family. She was forced to marry this man at the age of fourteen. Her husband and his family abused her. At the age of eighteen, she fled the abuse, but she was caught by the police, jailed for five months, and returned to her father, who then returned her to her husband. As revenge for her escape, Aisha's father-in-Law, husband and three other men of the family took Aisha to the mountains, cut off her nose and ears and left her to die. She crawled to her uncle's house but was refused help. She was finally offered asylum by her father and her grandfather who brought her to a U.S. military base.

Appearances in American news

Aisha's story first appeared in The Daily Beast in December 2009, which prompted many doctors to offer free help and reconstructive surgeries. The Grossmann Burn Foundation in California pledged to perform the necessary surgeries and began organizing for her visa in spring 2010. 

In March 2010, Diane Sawyer of ABC News covered her story, which she would revisit in 2014.

Aisha was featured on the August 2010 cover of Time magazine and in the corresponding article, "Afghan Women and the Return of the Taliban." The cover image generated enormous international controversy. The image and the accompanying cover title, "What Happens if We Leave Afghanistan", fueled debate about the Afghan War. Her cover photo was taken by the South African photographer Jodi Bieber and awarded the World Press Photo Award in 2010. This image of Aisha is sometimes compared to the Afghan Girl photograph of Sharbat Gula taken by Steve McCurry.

Life in the United States 
Shortly after Times cover in August 2010, Aisha was flown to the United States to receive free reconstructive surgery. After arriving in California, she psychologically regressed into psychogenic non-epileptic seizures, panic attacks, and self-harm that required hospitalization. Due to the events she had been subjected to, doctors determined she wasn't yet stable enough for the gruelling reconstructive surgery, and these traumas caused her to suffer with borderline personality disorder. While her reconstructive surgery was delayed, she was taken in by the Women for Afghan Women shelter in Queens, New York. Aisha's condition improved with a change in medications, and the seizures stopped.

Later, Aisha's psychological condition improved enough that she was able to stop taking medications to control her behavior. Starting in 2012, preparations to do a multistage facial reconstruction for Aisha began. Her forehead was expanded over the course of several months to provide enough tissue to build a new nose. The structure for her new nose was built using cartilage from her own body and tissue from her left hand was also used for the inner lining. Aisha underwent a total of 12 completed surgeries. In 2014 ABC News revisited Aisha and revealed how her new nose has altered her appearance. 

Aisha has been adopted by an Afghan-American couple, and, as of 2014, lives in Maryland. She studies English and mathematics and aspires to be a police officer.

References

External links
 Saving Aesha
 Afghan Women and the Return of the Taliban, the cover story in Time magazine
 Brutalized Afghan Woman Finds Strength Diane Sawyer ABC News Special on Bibi Aisha
 An Unspeakable Crime, Original Daily Beast Story by Gayle Tzemach Lemmon
 Grossman Burn Foundation Bibi Aisha page

Afghan expatriates in the United States
Living people
Year of birth missing (living people)
People notable for being the subject of a specific photograph
Violence against women in Afghanistan
Incidents of violence against women
Pashtun women
People with borderline personality disorder
Photography controversies